Kensington South was a parliamentary constituency centred on the Kensington district of west London.  It returned one Member of Parliament (MP)  to the House of Commons of the Parliament of the United Kingdom.

The constituency was created for the 1885 general election, and abolished for the February 1974 general election. In every postwar election until its abolition, it was the safest Conservative seat (excluding Northern Irish constituencies) in the country.

Members of Parliament

Boundaries 

Prior to 1885, the area was originally part of the Chelsea constituency. Following the Redistribution of Seats Act 1885, the new Kensington South seat was a single-member constituency consisting of all of the parliamentary borough of Kensington south of the Uxbridge Road.

Following boundary changes under the Representation of the People Act 1918, the constituency was defined as consisting of the Royal Borough of Kensington wards of Brompton, Earl's Court, Holland, Queen's Gate, and Redcliffe.

In the 1950 redistribution, Brompton ward was transferred to the Chelsea constituency. The constituency was thus now defined as consisting of the Royal Borough of Kensington wards of Earl's Court, Holland, Queen's Gate, and Redcliffe. It then remained unchanged until its abolition in 1974.

In 1965, under major local government boundary changes, the London County Council area was absorbed by the new Greater London Council, and the constituency was included in a new London Borough of Kensington and Chelsea. This did not affect parliamentary boundaries for another nine years, however.

In the 1974 redistribution, this constituency disappeared. Earl's Court and Redcliffe wards became part of the redrawn Chelsea constituency, while Holland and Queen's Gate wards became part of the new Kensington constituency.

Election results

Elections in the 1880s

Elections in the 1890s

Elections in the 1900s

Elections in the 1910s

Elections in the 1920s

*Cavendish-Bentinck was incorrectly labelled by the media as a National Liberal but corrected this label as 'anti-Conservative'.

Elections in the 1930s

Elections in the 1940s

Elections in the 1950s

Elections in the 1960s

Elections in the 1970s

References

 
 British Parliamentary Election Results 1885-1918, compiled and edited by F.W.S. Craig (Macmillan Press 1974)
 Debrett’s Illustrated Heraldic and Biographical House of Commons and the Judicial Bench 1886
 Debrett’s House of Commons and the Judicial Bench 1901
 Debrett’s House of Commons and the Judicial Bench 1918

Parliamentary constituencies in London (historic)
Constituencies of the Parliament of the United Kingdom established in 1885
Constituencies of the Parliament of the United Kingdom disestablished in 1974